Aerolíneas Estelar (formerly Estelar Latinoamérica C.A.) is a Venezuelan airline headquartered in Caracas operating out of Simón Bolívar International Airport.

History
The airline was founded in 2009. Its first flights were to Porlamar and within months it commenced a route to and from Maracaibo. It was a charter flight company, until it managed to consolidate itself over the years.

On November 6, 2017, the Chilean airline Latin American Wings terminated the contract with Estelar for non-payment, which caused passengers on the Santiago route to be stranded for three days at the airport.

In December 2017, Estelar announced its first intercontinental route from Caracas to Madrid, Spain. Therefore, it expanded its narrow-body fleet with an Airbus A340-300 on lease from Hi Fly Malta. The route to Madrid was operated with three weekly frequencies, replacing the old route operated by Conviasa. It also flew to Buenos Aires, with three frequencies a week.

Later, the airline leased an Airbus A380-800 from Hi Fly Malta because the leased A340 it was under repairs, making Estelar the first Americas' airline in history to operate the aircraft type.

Destinations

, Estelar serves the following domestic and international scheduled destinations:

Fleet

Current fleet
, the Estelar fleet consists of the following aircraft:

Former fleet

Accidents and incidents
On March 19, 2018, a Boeing 737-300 (registered YV2918) burst both tires on the right main gear after landing at Simón Bolívar International Airport. No one on board was injured and the aircraft was repaired.

On March 18, 2020, a Boeing 737-300 (registered YV-642T) was flying from Buenos Aires to Caracas when it was diverted to Cacique Aramare Airport due to atmospheric pressure issues, according to airline.

See also
List of airlines of Venezuela

References

External links

 Official website

Airlines of Venezuela
Airlines established in 2009
Venezuelan companies established in 2009